Minster FM was a local radio station serving York and the surrounding areas such as Selby, Tadcaster, Thirsk, Northallerton and Goole. The station closed on 31 August 2020 and its frequency is now a relay of Greatest Hits Radio Yorkshire York & North Yorkshire.  It broadcast on 104.7 FM from the Acklam Wold transmitter, near Leavening, on the Yorkshire Wolds.

History

Minster FM, named after York Minster, launched at 6am on Saturday 4 July 1992. This was nine years, to the day, after BBC Radio York started to broadcast. The first presenter to air on Minster FM was Daragh Corcoran and the first song played was 'Saturday in the Park' by Chicago and at the time of launch it had a live locally presented schedule 24 hours a day. This continued until the launch of Yorkshire Coast Radio in November 1993 when programmes between 10pm and 6am were broadcast (or networked) on both stations.

In 1996 the station added a transmitter to cover the Thirsk and Northallerton area using a signal on 102.3 FM from Calvert's Carpets in Thirsk.
 
In 2005, station owners The Local Radio Company (TLRC) secured a specific licence for the area and launched Minster Northallerton on that frequency.

TLRC was later taken over by UKRD, and in 2009, the new owners merged this station with its stations based in Darlington and Durham to form Star Radio.

On 17 December 2014, Minster FM started broadcasting on DAB digital radio, under the name More Minster. It is broadcast on the North Yorkshire DAB multiplex from various locations within Yorkshire, including Bilsdale, Acklam Wold, Hildebrand Barracks and Oliver's Mount.

More Minster carried Minster FM programmes in the morning and through the day. During the evening, the DAB schedule differed from the FM version, broadcasting its own dedicated programming.

In 2017, UKRD announced that it would give back Star Radio licences to the regulator Ofcom in return for the transfer of the Northallerton licence to Minster FM. This was confirmed on 4 April 2017. 102.3 FM once again began broadcasting Minster FM along with a transmitter covering the Northallerton area on 103.5 FM.

UKRD local radio stations were bought by Bauer Radio in 2019, along with many other local radio stations in England. On 1 September 2020 it became a part of Bauer Radio's Greatest Hits radio network with music from the 70s, 80s & 90s – this type of music having been phased in since its takeover.

In January 2021, a number of former presenters and staff from Minster FM launched a new digital radio station for the region, YorkMix Radio.

Awards
In 2009 Minster FM was one of three stations to be nominated for The Arqiva Station of the Year (under 300,000 listeners in TSA) - the station lost out to Lincs FM 102.2 in Lincolnshire.

In 2017, drivetime presenter Harry Whittaker received a nomination for 'Best New Show' at the UK ARIAS and 'Best Entertainment Programming' at the 2018 O2 media Awards

In 2019, Minster FM won the 'Charitable Business Award' at the Yorkshire Choice Awards 2019.

Programming before rebrand
The majority of Minster FM's programmings were produced and broadcast from its York studios. Live presenter-led programming aired from 4 am to 10 pm on weekdays, 6 am to 8 pm on Saturdays and 6 am to 7 pm, with automated non-stop music broadcast overnight. The sole syndicated programme on the station, produced by Salford-based Chris Country Radio, aired on Sunday evenings.

News 
Minster FM broadcast hourly local news bulletins from 6 am to 6 pm on weekdays and from 8 am to 1 pm at weekends. On weekdays, headlines and sports bulletins were broadcast on the half-hour during breakfast and drivetime shows.

During the station's early years, Minster FM's local news output was not produced in-house but contracted out to Yorkshire Television's regional news service Calendar.

At all other times, syndicated national bulletins from Sky News Radio were broadcast on the hour.

Notable former presenters
Stephanie Hirst
Roxanne Pallett
Ryan Swain

See also
 Greatest Hits Radio Yorkshire, which replaced Minster FM in September 2020

References

External links
 
 The Local Radio Company
 Jingles
 History of local radio in Yorkshire
 Acklam Wold transmitter
 Minster FM Public File

Bauer Radio
Radio stations in Yorkshire
Mass media in York
Radio stations established in 1992